The Wolfson Foundation is large UK registered charity that awards grants to support excellence in the fields of science and medicine, health, education and the arts and humanities. It was established in 1955 and re-registered in 2014.

Overview 
The endowment of the Wolfson Foundation is currently some £800 million, with an annual allocation of approximately £32 million. By 2015 over £800 million had been awarded in grants (£1.7 billion in real terms), with over 10,000 projects funded.

The foundation makes awards following a rigorous review process involving expert reviewers and advisory panels, and is recognised in the sector as a funder that listens actively to its applicants. Grants are generally given for capital infrastructure (new build, refurbishment and equipment) supporting excellence in the fields of science and medicine, health, education and the arts and humanities.

The foundation was established by and named after Sir Isaac Wolfson, chairman of Great Universal Stores (GUS). His wife and his son Lord Wolfson, were the other founder trustees. The current chairman is the Hon Dame Janet Wolfson de Botton DBE, and the chief executive is Paul Ramsbottom.

See also 
 Wolfson family
 Wolfson History Prize
 Wolfson College, Cambridge
 Wolfson College, Oxford

References

External links 
 Wolfson Foundation website
 Information from CharitiesDirect.com

1955 establishments in England
Organizations established in 1955
Foundations based in England
Funding bodies of England
Charities based in London